Jordin Sparks is the debut album by the American pop and R&B singer Jordin Sparks, released on November 20, 2007, in the United States, and November 27, 2007, in Canada. In the United States, it debuted at number ten on the Billboard 200 with sales of 119,000 copies in the first week. It has produced four top twenty singles, with "Tattoo" reaching number 8 on the US Billboard Hot 100, and "No Air" reaching number three. The album has sold over 3 million copies worldwide, her best-selling album by far. Sparks supported the album with the As I Am Tour and Jesse & Jordin LIVE Tour. The album was certified Platinum for sales in excess of 1,000,000 by the RIAA in the US on December 12, 2008.

Background
Sparks won the sixth season of American Idol. On August 17, 2007, it was announced Sparks had signed to 19 Recordings/Jive Records/Zomba Label Group, becoming the first Idol to join the label group, the second being David Archuleta the following year.  All past Idol winners and runners-up are or were signed with the RCA Label Group’s J (Fantasia, Ruben Studdard), Arista (Justin Guarini, Taylor Hicks, Blake Lewis) or RCA (Kelly Clarkson, Bo Bice, Clay Aiken, Katharine McPhee, Chris Daughtry, Diana DeGarmo and idol successor David Cook) labels, with the exception of Carrie Underwood signed to Arista Nashville. Sparks has stated that she recorded some songs for the album but the bulk of the recording was done in Los Angeles after the tour was over. She said the album would be "Top 40, radio-friendly, uplifting stuff" hopefully mixing "the pop rock sound of inaugural Idol Kelly Clarkson with the R&B edge of Beyoncé".

Release and promotion
Jordin confirmed on her MySpace that the official track listing as well as the release would carry bonus tracks at Wal-Mart, Sony, and the iTunes Store. An exclusive video of the photoshoot for Jordin Sparks was posted on Sparks' YouTube channel in October, where snippets of "Permanent Monday", "Overcome" and "One Step at a Time" could be heard. There are two available covers of the album, one for the US and Canada, and one for the UK and Australia, although the US and Canada cover was available in the UK and Australia (in stores and on iTunes) until "No Air" came out in those countries, in which the new cover was released. The song "Permanent Monday" was featured in the Salt Lake City audition episode on the 8th season of American Idol. The song "Young and In Love" & "This Is My Now" were featured in spirit episodes of MTV's The Hills.

Singles 
The first single released was "Tattoo", which was released to U.S. radio on August 27, 2007. The song became the album's first top ten hit, peaking at number eight on the Billboard Hot 100.
The second single released was "No Air", a duet with Chris Brown, which reached number three on the Billboard Hot 100. On February 28, 2008 Billboard stated that "No Air" was the top digital sales gainer after selling 73,000 downloads. Both "Tattoo" and "No Air" have been certified platinum by the RIAA. "No Air" has also reached number one in both the Australian and New Zealand singles charts. "No Air" was the number one song of 2008 in New Zealand.
The album's third single, "One Step at a Time" was released on June 10, 2008 and peaked at seventeen on the Hot 100 giving Sparks her fourth consecutive Top 20 single. She is the only American Idol contestant to have all of their first four singles become Top 20 hits.

Other songs 
"This Is My Now" was released after the victory of Sparks on American Idol. The song reached the Top 20 on the Billboard Hot 100, but never received official release as an album single.

Reception

The album entered the Billboard 200 at number ten, and has since sold over one million copies. It was released in the UK on April 14, 2008 but did not enter the UK album charts until July 2008, where it peaked at number 17. The album was certified Platinum in the U.S. on December 12, 2008.

Critical response to the album has been generally favorable. Billboard stated Jordin brought "a first effort that's all over the map—and works" while sounding "like exactly what she should be singing at this age and juncture in her career." Entertainment Weekly gave the album a B+ saying her debut "is as much effervescent fun as any post-Idol bow" and added "Idol has crowned winners with even bigger voices, but it hasn't given us one who's any easier on the ears."

Track listing

Personnel

Musicians
Vocals – Jordin Sparks (tracks 1-2, 4, 6-9),  (Lead- 3, 5, 10-12)
Featuring vocals by: Chris Brown (track 3) (Jive) 
Background vocals – Tracy Ackerman (track 12),  Sheree Ford Brown, Cathy Dennis (10), James Fauntleroy (3), Steve Russell (3), Chau Phan (5, 11)
Guitar — Dave Rainger, Henrik Jonback, Corky James, Andrew Hey, and Ian Dench
Bass — Henrik Jonback, Alex Al, Emanuel Kiriakou, and Walter Afanasieff

Production
Producers: Stargate, Jonas Jeberg, Cutfather, Robbie Nevil, The Underdogs, Erik "Bluetooth" Griggs, Bloodshy & Avant, Espionage, Emanuel Kiriakou, Klas Åhlund, Stephen Lipson
Vocal producer: Andrew Wyatt
Mastering: Tom Coyne
Engineers: Mikkel S. Eriksen, Matty Green, Dabling Harward, Andrew Hey, Adam Kagen, Emanuel Kiriakou, Robert Smith, Brian Sumner, Pat Thrall, Tim Weidner and Eric Rennaker
Assistant engineers: Jeremy Garrett, Clint Lawrence, Mike Laza, and Eric Rennaker
Mixing: Henrik Edenhed and Serban Ghenea
Mixing assistant: Josh Houghkirk and Nik Karpen
A&R: Nancy Roof and Jeff Fenster
Photography: Mary Ellen Matthews

Charts

Weekly charts

Year-end charts

Certifications

Release history

References

External links
 Official Jordin Sparks website
 Jordin Sparks MTV page

2007 debut albums
Jordin Sparks albums
19 Recordings albums
Jive Records albums
Albums produced by Klas Åhlund
Albums produced by Fernando Garibay
Albums produced by Stargate
Albums produced by Cutfather
Albums produced by Bloodshy & Avant
Albums produced by the Underdogs (production team)
Albums produced by Emanuel Kiriakou
Albums produced by Stephen Lipson